Rockingham Historic District is a national historic district located at Rockingham, Richmond County, North Carolina. The district encompasses 181 contributing buildings and 1 contributing site in a predominantly residential section of Rockingham.  It includes buildings built between the early-19th century through the early 20th century in a variety of popular architectural styles.  Notable buildings include the Steele-Johnson-Cole House (1838), Leak-Wall House (1853), W. C. Leak House (1890s), Ledbetter-Leath House, the W. B. Cole House, Dr. Robert S. Cole House, and Mial Leak House.

The Jay Helms House, 603 E. Washington Street, (c. 1946), a ranch style house, was designed by architect Joseph W. Royer.

The district was added to the National Register of Historic Places in 1983.

References

External links
Leak-Wall House website

Historic districts on the National Register of Historic Places in North Carolina
Houses in Richmond County, North Carolina
National Register of Historic Places in Richmond County, North Carolina